Basantpur  was a Bihar Legislative Assembly Constituency in Siwan district in the Indian state of Bihar. This Constituency was till 2010. In 2010, two blocks of Basantpur constituency were merged with Goreyakothi block and a new constituency was formed. Satyadeo Prasad Singh was Mla from this constituency From 2000 to 2005 and Manik Chandra Ray became Mla in 2005.
From 1985 to 2010 the Main Contestors of this Constituency were Satyadeo Prasad Singh Of BJP and Manik Chandra Rai of RJD.

Overview
It was part of Siwan Lok Sabha constituency.

As a consequence of the orders of the Delimitation Commission of India, Basantpur Assembly constituency ceased to exist in 2010.

Election results

1977-2005
In October 2005 and February 2005 state assembly elections Manik Chand Rai of RJD won the Basantpur assembly seat defeating his nearest rival Satyadeo Prasad Singh of BJP. Contests in most years were multi cornered but only winners and runners are being mentioned. Satydeo Prasad Singh of BJP defeated Manik Chand Rai of RJD in 2000. Manik Chand Rai of JD defeated Satyadeo Prasad Singh of BJP in 1995. Manik Chand Rai of Congress defeated Satydeo Prasad Singh of BJP in 1990 and 1985. Manik Chand Rai of Janata Party (Secular – Charan Singh) defeated Tarakeshwar Nath Singh of Congress in 1980. Bidya Bhusan Singh defeated Manik Chand Rai, Independent, in 1977.

References

Former assembly constituencies of Bihar
Politics of Siwan district